Wairakite is a zeolite mineral with an analcime structure but containing a calcium ion. The chemical composition is Ca8(Al16Si32O96)•16H2O. It is named for the location of its discovery in Wairakei, North Island, New Zealand, by Alfred Steiner in 1955.  The first finds were in hydrothermally altered rhyolitic tuffs, ignimbrites and volcaniclastic rocks. The mineral has since been found in metamorphic rocks and in geothermal areas. It was most likely first successfully synthesized in a laboratory in 1970.

References

Zeolites
Monoclinic minerals
Minerals in space group 15